Elin Eldebrink (born 4 January 1988 in Östertälje) is a Swedish basketball player who plays for CJM Bourges Basket.

Her twin sister Frida is also a basketball player.  They are daughters of Kenth Eldebrink, javelin thrower and olympic medallist in 1984, while their uncle Anders Eldebrink is a former professional ice hockey player.

References

1988 births
Living people
Swedish women's basketball players
People from Södertälje
Tarbes Gespe Bigorre players
Swedish twins
Sportspeople from Stockholm County
21st-century Swedish women